Oplećani or Oplećane is a village in the municipality of Tomislavgrad in Canton 10, the Federation of Bosnia and Herzegovina, Bosnia and Herzegovina.

Name 

Originally, the village was called Oplećane.

History 

Franciscan Petar Bakula wrote two schematisms, one for the Franciscan Province of Herzegovina in 1867, and the other for the Apostolic Vicariate of Herzegovina in 1873. According to these two schematisms, in 1867, Oplećani had 25 Catholics, and in 1873, their number rose to 46.

Northeast of the village there's an Illyrian fortress, while in the Catholic and the Eastern Orthodox cemeteries there are 24 stećci, medieval tombstones.

Population

Footnotes

Bibliography 

 
 
 
 
 
 
 
 
 

Populated places in Tomislavgrad